Apele Vii is a commune in Dolj County, Oltenia, Romania with a population of 2,487 people. It is composed of a single village, Apele Vii.

References

Communes in Dolj County
Localities in Oltenia